May Arslan (1928–2013) was a Lebanese Druze woman who was a member of the Arslan family, and her father was Shakib Arslan. She was the mother of Walid Jumblatt and the spouse of Kamal Jumblatt, founder and leader of the Progressive Socialist Party.

Biography
Arslan was born in Lausanne, Switzerland, in 1928 into a well-established Druze family. Shewas the daughter of Shakib Arslan who was in exile in Switzerland when she was born. Her mother was a Circassian woman, Salima El Khass, who was twenty years younger than Shakib Arslan. She was born in Russia and her family fled to Jordan due to violent persecution of Muslims by the Russian authorities. Then they settled in Istanbul where she met with Shakib Arslan who was serving as a deputy in the Ottoman Parliament for his native province of Hauran. They married in Beirut in 1916. May Arslan had a brother, Ghaleb, and a sister, Nazimah.

May Arslan was first educated in Lebanon and received higher education in France. She married Kamal Jumblatt in Geneva on 1 May 1948. Their families were both Druze, but rival groups. They had a son, Walid Jumblatt. Although their marriage was for love, Kamal Jumblatt and May Arslan divorced. Arslan's former husband Kamal Jumblatt was assassinated in 1977. She died on 9 September 2013 at age 85. A funeral ceremony was held in Moukhtara on 11 September.

References

20th-century Lebanese women
1928 births
2013 deaths
May
May
Lebanese Druze
People from Chouf District
People from Lausanne
People of Circassian descent